Cycas glauca is a species of cycad endemic to the Lesser Sunda Islands of Indonesia. It occurs on Timor and Sumba islands.

References

glauca